Rao's is a Southern Italian restaurant founded in 1896. It is located at 455 East 114th Street, on the corner of Pleasant Avenue in East Harlem, New York City. Rao's has sister restaurants in Los Angeles and Las Vegas, Nevada.

History
The restaurant was started in 1896 by Joshua Anthony Rao, who moved with his parents from Italy to the United States. He bought a small shop in Italian Harlem, once a very large Italian-American community, and ran the restaurant until his death in 1909. Louis Rao took over the business. He was seen by many as a very suave man. He had his hair cut at the Waldorf-Astoria Hotel and wore many fancy suits. 

In December 2006, Rao's opened a second restaurant in Las Vegas, under executive chef Carla Pellegrino, with two ten-table rooms and additional seating available on an outdoor garden patio. In early 2009, Rao's in Las Vegas opened a bocce bar outside and began offering bocce lessons and cocktails there.  In July 2013, Frank Pellegrino Jr. announced on Late Night with Jimmy Fallon that Rao's will open in Hollywood soon. It has since been opened.

Rao's now sells products in gourmet markets and supermarkets.  Products include pasta, sauces, as well as olive oil.

Though small, Italian Harlem culture is still kept alive by Rao's and the Giglio Society of East Harlem. Every year on the second weekend of August in honor of Back To School, the Feast of Our Lady of Mount Carmel and the "Dancing of the Giglio" is performed while thousands of visitors and onlookers celebrate the once largest Italian community in New York City.

The New York Post describes the restaurant as "one of the hardest places to get into in the city".
Notable patrons of the eatery have included John Gotti, Rudy Giuliani, Robert De Niro, Al Pacino, Matt Sullivan, Paul Vario, Anthony Salerno, Henry Hill, Steven Crea, Michael Rosenthal, Bill Clinton, Hillary Clinton, Anthony Scaramucci, Donald Trump, Bo Dietl and many New York members of the La Cosa Nostra.

In media

Film
In the movie The Wolf of Wall Street, which premiered in December 2013, Jordan Belfort (Leonardo DiCaprio) is seen eating dinner in Rao's restaurant during a meeting with private investigator Bo Dietl.

Woody Allen and Mia Farrow regularly ate at Rao's in the 1980s. Mrs. Rao inspired the character Tina Vitale in his 1984 film Broadway Danny Rose.

Music
In 2009, Jay-Z shot the music video for "D.O.A." (Death of Autotune) at Rao's.

Television
Rao's was the basis for "Raimondo's," a fictional restaurant featured as the site of a murder in the Law & Order episode "Everybody Loves Raimondo's."  The owner of the fictional restaurant was played by actor Ray Abruzzo, who later co-starred with Pellegrino on The Sopranos. The episode was based on a shooting at the restaurant in 2003.

On Top Chef: All Stars, season 8, episode 8, an elimination challenge required the chefs to cook a three-course family-style Italian meal at Rao's restaurant for the judges and Rao's owners and staff.

On an episode of Kitchen Nightmares, Season 7, episode 2 "Pantaleone's", Gordon Ramsay talks about the history of Rao's restaurant to the family who owns the pizza shop "Pantalone's" in Denver, Colorado. He then takes the father and son to the Rao's restaurant at Caesar's Palace in Las Vegas. They then meet the owner, Frank Pellegrino Jr., and learn that he is the fourth generation of successors to operate the family-owned restaurant.

Rao's was profiled on the pilot episode of Guilty Pleasures as home of Bobby Flay's favorite meal.

See also
 List of Italian restaurants

References

External links
 
 
 

Restaurants in Manhattan
Restaurants established in 1896
Italian-American culture in New York City
Italian restaurants in the United States
East Harlem